Havola Escarpment is an isolated, snow-covered escarpment about  northwest of the Thiel Mountains in Antarctica. The escarpment is arc shaped, 30 nautical miles long, and faces south. It was observed and mapped by the United States Antarctic Research Program Horlick Mountains Traverse party, 1958–59, and was named by the Advisory Committee on Antarctic Names for Major Antero Havola, US Army, the leader of the 700 nautical mile tractor traverse from Byrd Station to South Pole Station from December 8, 1960, to January 11, 1961. On December 25, 1960, the Havola party passed a few miles northward of this escarpment.

See also
Davis Promontory

References

Escarpments of Antarctica
Landforms of Ellsworth Land